The 1963–64 Georgetown Hoyas men's basketball team represented Georgetown University during the 1963–64 NCAA University Division college basketball season. Tommy O'Keefe coached them in his fourth season as head coach, but Georgetown's head coaching position paid so little that he could only coach part-time and held a full-time job outside of coaching in order to meet his financial obligations, impairing his ability to recruit players. The team was an independent and played its home games at McDonough Gymnasium on the Georgetown campus in Washington, D.C. It finished the season with a record of 15-10 and had no postseason play.

Season recap

Georgetown looked forward to having senior guard Jim Christy, the team's point guard and team captain, and junior forward Jim Barry – perhaps the best player of Georgetown men's basketball's "Classic Era" (1943–1972) – together again after their high-scoring performances the previous season, raising hopes that they could lead the team to a postseason tournament berth. Barry, however, was forced to miss the 1963–64 season while recovering from knee surgery.

Sophomore guard Jim Brown joined the varsity team this year after emerging as a top scorer on the freshman team the previous year. He started the season opener, in which his fast-break style of offense helped the Hoyas to beat Maryland by 21 points. Another newcomer to the team, sophomore forward Owen Gillen, scored 14 points and had 10 rebounds in the game.

Fifteen days later, Georgetown began play in the Quaker City Classic at the Palestra in Philadelphia, Pennsylvania. Its first opponent was No.1 Loyola of Chicago. Led by John Egan, Loyola was the defending champion from the 1963 NCAA Tournament, entered the game with a 22-game winning streak, and was a 28-point favorite. Jim Brown's defense kept Egan in check, Jim Christy scored 30 points, and the Hoyas led by 12 points at the half and won the game 69-58. It was Georgetown's first-ever victory over a No. 1-ranked opponent.

Jim Brown had a season-high 14 points against Navy. He went on to finish the season averaging 12.5 points per game and with a school-record 148 assists; he would break that record himself two seasons later.

In the Hoyas' next game, eleven days later against La Salle, Jim Christy scored on eight consecutive field goals. Two weeks after that, Christy scored his 1,000th point in a game against New York University and scored on a late-game layup that helped Georgetown to come from behind to beat NYU, pushing the Hoyas' record to 12-8 and renewing hopes that they could secure an invitation to the 1964 National Invitation Tournament. Sophomore forward John "Jake" Gibbons, meanwhile, scored 26 points in a game against George Washington. Owen Gillen had a season-high 23 points against Canisius and also had strong performances against Fordham, Boston College, Holy Cross, and Rutgers, finishing the season as the team's leading rebounder.

During a 107–92 Georgetown loss to Boston College at the Roberts Center in Chestnut Hill, Massachusetts, on February 21, 1964, Boston College guard John Austin — a Washington, D.C., native and DeMatha Catholic High School graduate who was the first African American basketball player in Boston College history — scored 49 points, setting a single-game school scoring record for the Eagles as well as the record for points scored against Georgetown by an opponent in a single game. Both records still stood as of 2018.

Four days later, Jim Christy had an historic game at Maryland on February 25, 1964. He scored 11 of the game's first 16 points and finished with a school-record 44 points, shooting 14-for-19 (73%) from the field and 16-of-18 (89%) from the free-throw line as the Hoyas upset the Terrapins. The win gave Georgetown the so-called "Big Three" title for the year among the Washington, D.C., area's three major college men's basketball teams (Georgetown, George Washington, and Maryland). As impressive as a 44-point game was, Christy's record would stand for only a year and two days until Jim Barry scored 46 points in a game in late February 1965.

The team played inconsistently most of the season and finished with a record of 15-10 and no postseason play. The 15 wins were the most by a Georgetown team since the 1951-52 team won 15, leaving observers to contemplate whether the 1963–64 team might have made the postseason if forward Jim Barry had been available to play.

The team was not ranked in the Top 20 in the Associated Press Poll or Coaches' Poll at any time.

Roster
From the 1958-59 season through the 1967-68 season, Georgetown players wore even-numbered jerseys for home games and odd-numbered ones for away games; for example, a player would wear No. 10 at home and No. 11 on the road. Players are listed below by the even numbers they wore at home.

Source

1963–64 schedule and results

Sources

|-
!colspan=9 style="background:#002147; color:#8D817B;"| Regular season

References

Georgetown Hoyas men's basketball seasons
Georgetown
Georgetown Hoyas men's basketball team
Georgetown Hoyas men's basketball team